The Canadian Free Trade Agreement (CFTA; , ALÉC) is an agreement that governs trade between the Canadian provinces and territories. It took effect on 1 July 2017, replacing the 22-year old Agreement on Internal Trade.

History

Background 
As one of the most decentralised federations in the world, the question of internal barriers in the Canadian economy has long been a controversial one. 

Section 121 of the Constitution Act, 1867, one of the major laws making up the constitution of Canada, states that "All Articles of the Growth, Produce, or Manufacture of any one of the Provinces shall, from and after the Union, be admitted free into each of the other Provinces." However, the following section states that provinces may continue their pre-existing customs and excise laws.

In 1995, the Agreement on Internal Trade was ratified and came into effect, a major free trade agreement between the Canadian provinces and territories, and eliminating multiple barriers to free movement of people, goods, services and investments within Canada. In 2010, a further free trade deal came into effect between Alberta, British Columbia, Saskatchewan, and Manitoba, the New West Partnership.

In 2012, the RCMP led a sting operation against illegal alcohol imports across the Québec-New Brunswick border, arresting and issuing fines to 17 people. One of those arrested in the operation, Gérard Comeau, then challenged the fine in courts, arguing that the import laws broke Section 121 of the Constitution Act, 1867. Comeau ultimately lost the court case, with the Supreme Court of Canada stating that "the Canadian federation provides space to each province to regulate the economy in a manner that reflects local concerns."

In 2016, the federal Standing Senate Committee on Banking, Trade and Commerce released a report titled Tear Down These Walls: Dismantling Canada’s Internal Trade Barriers, finding that internal trade barriers cost the Canadian economy up to $130 billion yearly and that "far too many unnecessary regulatory and legislative differences exist among Canada’s jurisdictions."

Negotiations  
At the annual summer Council of the Federation in July 2016, held in Whitehorse in the Yukon, the 13 premiers announced that they had reached an agreement in principle to replace the Agreement on Internal Trade with a new, updated free trade agreement called the Canadian Free Trade Agreement. While claiming that the agreement would cover most of the Canadian economy and negotiating with a "negative list" approach, where sectors had to be explicitly named to be exempted, the premiers, however, did not immediately release the list of exemptions to the agreement, nor released the full details of what had been agreed thus far.

After news of the announcement, federal Minister of Innovation, Science and Industry Navdeep Bains stated that the agreement was more ambitious than the Comprehensive Economic and Trade Agreement between Canada and the European Union and expressed hopes that the final details of the agreement would be agreed shortly. However, alcohol remained excluded from the agreement, despite the federal government having lobbied the provincial governments to include it.

The agreement came into effect on 1 July 2017, the same day as the 150th anniversary of Confederation.

Reception 
Initial reactions to the agreement were largely positive, with supporters pointing to the increased liberalisation in trade and that the agreement opened up the possibility to further decrease remaining barriers in the future.

Despite the increased liberalisation in trade, the agreement was criticised by some commentators for not going far enough, with significant barriers still remaining between the provinces. The NGO Canadian Constitution Foundation stated that, while the CFTA might bring slight improvements from the AIT, "no one should confuse it with real free trade."

Critics have noted that as of 2021, few provinces have acted on their promise to uphold the CFTA, with British Columbia even adding barriers to provincial trade. According to a study published in 2019, removing barriers to Canadian interprovincial trade would increase Canada’s GDP per capita by as much as 3.8%.

Future developments  
In November 2018, the Albertan government launched a complaint under the agreement against Ontario over Ontario's regulation of sales of Albertan alcoholic beverages in Ontario.

A 2018 study found that provincial trade barriers have declined by 15% over the previous 20 years. A 2019 working paper from the International Monetary Fund found that internal trade barriers continued to impact Canadian GDP by as much as 4% and that there was "significant scope to build on the new Canadian Free Trade Agreement."

A 2019 Ipsos poll found that 87% of those polled believed that Canadians should have the right to "bring any legally purchased product from one province to another" and that there should be free trade between the provinces.

In September 2019, Premier of Alberta Jason Kenney announced that his government would be eliminating eight Alberta-specific exemptions from the agreement. The move changed Alberta from being the province with the third-highest number of specific exemptions to the one with the fewest.

References

External links  
 Canadian Free Trade Agreement at The Canadian Encyclopedia

Canadian law articles needing expert attention
2017 in Canada
Free trade agreements of Canada
Economy of Canada
Federalism in Canada